Bocicoel may refer to:

 Bocicoel, a village in Bogdan Vodă Commune, Maramureș County, Romania
 Bocicoel River, a tributary of the Vişeu River in Romania